Mohammad Jan Abdullah Wardak (1954 or 1955 – 13 September 2008) was an Afghan politician and former Mujahideen commander. He served as a government Minister and Governor of Logar Province.

Biography 
Abdullah Wardak, an ethnic Pashtun, was born in the Wardak Province of Afghanistan.

During the Soviet occupation of Afghanistan he fought as a Mujahideen. He was aligned with Abdul Rasul Sayyaf's Islamic Union for the liberation of Afghanistan party. When the Taliban came to power he fought against them as part of the Northern Alliance. He fought alongside the American forces in 2001, helping to overthrow the Taliban regime.

In December 2001, following the Bonn Agreement, Abdullah Wardak was appointed Minister of Martyrs and Disabled in the Afghan Transitional Administration of Hamid Karzai. A position he held until a new Cabinet was selected in December 2004 following the presidential election. In July 2007 he was appointed Governor of Logar Province, replacing Sayed Abdul Karim Hashimi, who was perceived as being ineffective on counter-insurgency measures.

In January 2005 Abdullah Wardak visited Evansville, Indiana and spoke at the Bethel Temple Community Church. He spoke about the war in Afghanistan and how he was helping the church to open a school, an orphanage and a home for widows in Kabul. He received the key to the city from Mayor Jonathan Weinzapfel.

Assassination 
On the morning of 13 September 2008 Abdullah Wardak left his residence in Paghman and was being driven to his office. It was whilst his vehicle was crossing a dry river bed that a remote control mine was detonated. The car was destroyed and Abdullah Wardak, his driver and two bodyguards were killed. The attack happened at around 08:00 local time, approximately 300 yards from Abdullah Wardak's home. Taliban spokesman Zabiullah Mujahid said the bomb had been remotely detonated by two Taliban insurgents.Abdullah Wardak is the second provincial Governor to be assassinated by the Taliban. The first was the Governor of Paktia Province, Hakim Taniwal in September 2006.President Hamid Karzai condemned the assassination by "terrorists" and was said to be "deeply saddened" he described Abdullah Wardak as a "true son of Afghanistan". Zemarai Bashary a spokesman for the Interior ministry said "The Governor has been martyred".

On 14 September 2008 Abdullah Wardak's funeral was held at the mosque in Pajak village, Paghman District, he was buried in the grounds of his home. The funeral was held amid tight security and attended by government officials and members of the United National Front.

References

External links 
Abdullah Wardak at ISN

Year of birth unknown
1950s births
2008 deaths
Pashtun people
Afghan Muslims
Governors of Logar Province
Mujahideen members of the Soviet–Afghan War
Government ministers of Afghanistan
Assassinated Afghan politicians
Afghan terrorism victims
Terrorism deaths in Afghanistan
Islamic Dawah Organisation of Afghanistan politicians
People killed by the Taliban